The men's singles Badminton event at the 2017 Summer Universiade was held from August 27 to 29 at the Taipei Gymnasium in Taipei, Taiwan.

Draw

Finals 

RET= Retired

Top half

Section 1

Section 2

Section 3

Section 4

Bottom half

Section 5

Section 6

Section 7

Section 8

References
Draw

Men's singles